Cléber Guedes de Lima or simply Cléber (born 29 April 1974 in Brasília) is a retired Brazilian footballer, who played as a defender during his career.

Honours

XV de Piracicaba
Série C: 1995

Cruzeiro
Copa Libertadores: 1997

Wisła Kraków
Ekstraklasa: 2007–08, 2008–09, 2010–11

Individual
The best foreigner in Ekstraklasa: 2006

References

1974 births
Living people
Brazilian footballers
Brazilian expatriate footballers
Cruzeiro Esporte Clube players
Esporte Clube XV de Novembro (Piracicaba) players
Guarani FC players
Sociedade Esportiva do Gama players
União Agrícola Barbarense Futebol Clube players
C.F. Os Belenenses players
Wisła Kraków players
FC Akhmat Grozny players
Expatriate footballers in Poland
Expatriate footballers in Portugal
Expatriate footballers in Russia
Ekstraklasa players
Primeira Liga players
Russian Premier League players
Brazilian expatriate sportspeople in Poland
Association football defenders
Footballers from Brasília